Stephan Dabbert (born 23 June 1958 in Braunschweig, Germany) is an
agricultural economist and Rector of the University of Hohenheim.

Biography 
The agricultural economist Stephan Dabbert studied agriculture at Christian-Albrecht University in Kiel, followed by a Master of Science degree in agricultural economics at Pennsylvania State University.

He obtained his doctorate from the University of Hohenheim (Germany)in 1990, as well as his professorship in the area of agricultural business management.

He led the Institute for Social Economy from 1992 until 1994 at the Centre for Agrarian Landscape and Land Use Research in Muencheberg. He has held the chair and leadership of the Department of Production Theory and Resource
Economics in Hohenheim since 1994. From 2000 to 2002 he was Dean of Faculty IV - Agricultural Science II – Agricultural Economics, Agricultural Technology and Livestock Farming at Hohenheim University. From 2002 to 2006 he was Dean of the amalgamated Faculty of Agricultural Science in Hohenheim. He was elected Rector in preference to 13 
other candidates by a large majority 2012.

Field of interest and publications 
Economic questions concerning ecological cultivation are a focus of Prof. Dabbert’s research. A further emphasis is interdisciplinary modelling, by means of which agriculture can be represented at the countryside or regional level.
 Researchprojects of Stephan Dabbert
 Publications of Stephan Dabbert

References

External links 
 Prof. Dr. Stephan Dabbert on the Webpage University of Hohenheim

Living people
Scientists from Braunschweig
German agronomists
1958 births